The O'Connor–Proctor Building on N. Main in  Victoria, Texas was built in 1895 at cost of $7,721.  It was designed by architect Paul Helwig and its exterior is "St. Louis red brick trimmed with Kerrville white limestone".  It was listed on the National Register of Historic Places in 1986.

In 2013 it is the headquarters building of the Junior League of Victoria.

See also

National Register of Historic Places listings in Victoria County, Texas
Recorded Texas Historic Landmarks in Victoria County

References

External links

O'Connor–Proctor Building Rentals

Commercial buildings on the National Register of Historic Places in Texas
Romanesque Revival architecture in Texas
Commercial buildings completed in 1895
Buildings and structures in Victoria, Texas
National Register of Historic Places in Victoria, Texas
Recorded Texas Historic Landmarks